Nahid Kulenović (5 July 1929 – 30 June 1969) was an emigree Croatian newspaper columnist, editor (Hrvatska sloboda, Hrvatska straža) and activist, president of the German branch of Croatian Liberation Movement (HOP). He was the son of Džafer Kulenović, a highly ranked official of the Independent State of Croatia, and was married to Marijana, daughter of a Croatian activist, Berislav Đuro Deželić.

Kulenović was assassinated, reportedly by the Yugoslav Secret Police (UDBA), in his Munich apartment in June 1969.

References

1929 births
1969 deaths
Bosnia and Herzegovina emigrants to Germany
Bosnia and Herzegovina Muslims
Assassinated Bosnia and Herzegovina people
Bosnia and Herzegovina people murdered abroad
Croatian emigrants to Germany
Croatian Muslims
Assassinated Croatian journalists
Croatian people murdered abroad
People murdered in Germany
Assassinated Yugoslav people

Bosniaks of Croatia